Governor Chaves may refer to:

José Antonio Chaves, Governor of the territory of Santa Fe de Nuevo México from 1829 to 1832
Mariano Chaves (1799–1845), Acting Mexican Governor of New Mexico in 1844
Francisco Xavier Chávez (1768–1838), 2nd Governor of Santa Fe de Nuevo México in 1822